The 2021–22 season is Muangthong United Football Club's 15th existence in the new era since they took over from Nongchok Pittaya Nusorn Football Club in 2007. It is the 5th season in the Thai League and the club's 13th consecutive season in the top flight of the Thai football league system since promoted in the 2009 season.

Squad

Transfer

In 

Pre-season transfer

Mid-season transfer

Out 

Pre-season

Mid-season

Loan Out 

Pre-season

Mid-Season

Return from loan

Pre-season

Extension

Friendlies

Pre-Season Friendly

In-Season friendlies

Competitions

Overview

Thai League 1

League table

Results summary

Results by matchday

Matches

Thai FA Cup

Matches

Thai League Cup

Matches

Team statistics

Appearances and goals

Notes

References 

MTU
2020